Jiangnan Circuit or Jiangnan Province was one of the major circuits during the Tang dynasty, Five Dynasties period, and early Song dynasty. During the Tang dynasty it was known as Jiangnan Dao, and during the Song dynasty Jiangnan Lu, but both dao and lu can be translated as "circuit". In 1020 it was divided into 2 circuits: Jiangnan East Circuit and Jiangnan West Circuit.

During the Tang dynasty, its administrative area included Zhejiang, Fujian, Jiangxi, Hunan, as well as some parts of Jiangsu, Anhui, Hubei, Sichuan and Guizhou, with its capital in Suzhou.

Its name"South of the River"refers to its location south of the Yangtze.

West Jiangnan, the future eponym of modern Jiangxi, was later separated from it.

See also
 Tang dynasty
 Administrative divisions of the Tang dynasty
 History of the administrative divisions of China

Circuits of the Tang dynasty
Circuits of the Song dynasty
Former circuits in Zhejiang
Former circuits in Fujian
Former circuits in Jiangxi
Former circuits in Jiangsu
Former circuits in Anhui
Former circuits in Hubei
Former circuits in Sichuan
Former circuits in Guizhou